Mohammad Shahjahan Politician of Chuadanga District of Bangladesh and former member of Parliament for Chuadanga-1 constituency in 1988.

Birth and early life 
Shahjahan was born on 31 December 1935 in Alamdanga upazila of Chuadanga district. His father Khodadad Hossain, mother Shubhtara.

Career 
Mohammad Shahjahan was one of the local protesters in the language movement in 1952. In 1971 he was one of the organizers of the war of liberation. In 1972, the ILO He represented Bangladesh in the conference. He was elected to parliament from Chuadanga-1 as a Bangladesh Awami League candidate in 1988 Bangladeshi general election.

References 

Living people
1935 births
People from Chuadanga District
Awami League politicians
4th Jatiya Sangsad members